Banī ʿAwn is a sub-district located in the Shar'ab as-Salam District, Taiz Governorate, Yemen. Banī ʿAwn had a population of 4,175 according to the 2004 census.

Villages
Al-watia Al-kariba.
Qa'dar *Al-mathirah.
Al-hayja village.
Al-qarf village.
Al-hajifuh village.
Al-hawabis village.
Al-kharayib village.
kawayakban village.
Al-karba village.

References

Sub-districts in Shar'ab as-Salam District